|}

The King Edward VII Stakes is a Group 2 flat horse race in Great Britain open to three-year-old colts and geldings. It is run at Ascot over a distance of 1 mile 3 furlongs and 211 yards (2,406 metres), and it is scheduled to take place each year in June.

The event was established in 1834, and it was originally known as the Ascot Derby. In the early part of its history it was also open to fillies. The race was renamed in memory of King Edward VII in 1926.

The King Edward VII Stakes is currently held about two weeks after The Derby, and it usually features horses which were entered for that race. It is contested on the fourth day of the five-day Royal Ascot meeting.

Records
Leading jockey (7 wins):
 Morny Cannon – St Simon of the Rock (1891), Matchmaker (1895), Conroy (1896), Frontier (1899), Osboch (1901), Flying Lemur (1902), Darley Dale (1904)

Leading trainer (9 wins):
 John Porter – The Palmer (1867), Pero Gomez (1869), Shotover (1882), The Child of the Mist (1885), Matchmaker (1895), Conroy (1896), Frontier (1899), Flying Lemur (1902), Darley Dale (1904)

Winners since 1965

Earlier winners

 1834: Pussy
 1835: Griselda
 1836: Lieutenant
 1837: Mango
 1838: no race
 1839: Bloomsbury
 1840: Bokhara
 1841: Coronation
 1842: Envoy
 1843: Amorino
 1844: The Miser Scarve
 1845: Wood Pigeon
 1846: Bravissimo
 1847: Conyngham
 1848: Distaffina
 1849: Repletion
 1850: Musician
 1851: Phlegethon
 1852: Convulsion
 1853: Ninnyhammer
 1854: Phaeton
 1855: Pugnator
 1856: Fly-by-Night
 1857: Sydney
 1858: Toxophilite
 1859: Gamester
 1860: The Wizard
 1861: Janus
 1862: Carisbrook
 1863: Onesander
 1864: Peon
 1865: Celerimma
 1866: Staghound
 1867: The Palmer
 1868: The Earl
 1869: Pero Gomez
 1870: King Cole
 1871: Henry
 1872: Drumochter
 1873: Gang Forward
 1874: Atlantic
 1875: Gilbert
 1876: Forerunner
 1877: Silvio
 1878: Insulaire
 1879: Chippendale
 1880: Mask
 1881: Maskelyne
 1882: Shotover
 1883: Ladislas
 1884: Brest
 1885: The Child of the Mist
 1886: St Mirin
 1887: Timothy
 1888: Sheen
 1889: Morglay
 1890: Battle-axe
 1891: St Simon of the Rock
 1892: Llanthony
 1893: Phocion
 1894: None the Wiser
 1895: Matchmaker
 1896: Conroy
 1897: Minstrel
 1898: Purser
 1899: Frontier
 1900: Ecton
 1901: Osboch
 1902: Flying Lemur
 1903: Kroonstad
 1904: Darley Dale
 1905: Pure Crystal
 1906: Poussin
 1907: All Black
 1908: Dibs
 1909: William the Fourth
 1910: Decision
 1911: King William
 1912: Jaeger
 1913: Pilliwinkle
 1914: Corcyra
 1915–18: no race
 1919: Old Bill
 1920: Caligula
 1921: Nippon
 1922: Backwood
 1923: Bold and Bad
 1924: Polyphontes
 1925: Solario
 1926: Finglas
 1927: Buckfast
 1928: Cyclonic
 1929: Horus
 1930: Pinxit
 1931: Sandwich
 1932: Dastur
 1933: Sans Peine
 1934: Berestoi
 1935: Field Trial
 1936: Precipitation
 1937: Solfo
 1938: Foroughi
 1939: Hypnotist
 1940–45: no race
 1946: Field Day
 1947: Migoli
 1948: Vic Day
 1949: Swallow Tail
 1950: Babu's Pet
 1951: Supreme Court
 1952: Castleton
 1953: Skyraider
 1954: Rashleigh
 1955: Nucleus
 1956: Court Command
 1957: Arctic Explorer
 1958: Restoration
 1959: Pindari
 1960: Atrax
 1961: Aurelius
 1962: Gaul
 1963: Only for Life
 1964: no race

See also
 Horse racing in Great Britain
 List of British flat horse races
 Recurring sporting events established in 1834  – this race is included under its original title, Ascot Derby Stakes.

References
 Paris-Turf:
 Racing Post:

 galopp-sieger.de – King Edward VII Stakes (ex Ascot Derby Stakes).
 horseracingintfed.com – International Federation of Horseracing Authorities – King Edward VII Stakes (2019).
 pedigreequery.com – King Edward VII Stakes – Ascot.
 

Flat races in Great Britain
Ascot Racecourse
Flat horse races for three-year-olds